Paralytic Tonight, Dublin Tomorrow is a 7" extended play released in March 1980 by Australian Punk band The Saints. It was produced by the group's singer-guitarist, Chris Bailey using the pseudonym L. Lambert. It is their first release after founding guitarist, Ed Kuepper, had left the band. The Saints line-up for the EP was Chris Bailey on lead vocals and guitar; C. Barrington on guitar; Cub Calloway on guitar; Ivor Hay on drums; and Janine Hall on bass guitar. A 12" version with an additional track, "Miss Wonderful", was issued on the French label, New Rose.

Reception 

Clinton Walker described Paralytic Tonight, Dublin Tomorrow as, "shambolic in the extreme, but still possessed of a certain spark." Australian musician, Paul Kelly remembered that he had "cottoned onto The Saints around the time of Prehistoric Sounds, their third album. Paralytic Tonight is a four track EP that came not long after. I played it over and over again in a flat on Punt Road. This was their great middle period." AllMusic's Mark Deming rated it as three-and-a-half stars out of five and explained, "While these four songs (or five, depending on which version you buy) are tougher and more rock-oriented than the albums that would soon follow from Bailey's edition of the group, they're still a far cry from the breakneck fury of (I'm) Stranded or Eternally Yours."

Track listing 

Australian release
 Lost Records/EMI (PRS-2773)

Side A

 "Simple Love" (Chris Bailey) – (3:45)
 "(Don't send me) Roses" (Bailey) – (3:50)

Side B

 "On the Waterfront" (Bailey) – (3:20)
 "Call It Mine" (Bailey) – (4:50)

French release
 New Rose (NEW-1)

Side A

 "Simple Love" (Bailey) – (3:40)
 "(Don't send me) Roses" (Bailey) – (5:22)
 "Miss Wonderful" (Bailey) – (4:20)

Side B

 "On the Waterfront" (Bailey) – (3:18)
 "Call It Mine" (Bailey) – (4:52)

Personnel
The Saints
Chris Bailey - vocals, guitar
Barrington Francis, Bruce "Cub" Callaway - guitar
Janine Hall - bass
Ivor Hay - drums
Technical
Les Lambert - recording
John Morgan - cover
Judi Dransfield - photography

References

The Saints (Australian band) EPs
1980 EPs